Pascale Mainville (born 29 March 1973) is a Canadian judoka. She competed in the women's lightweight event at the 1992 Summer Olympics.

References

External links
 

1973 births
Living people
Canadian female judoka
Olympic judoka of Canada
Judoka at the 1992 Summer Olympics
Sportspeople from Montreal